Gariboldi is an Italian surname. Notable people with the surname include:

Gaetano Gariboldi (1815–1857), Italian painter
Giuseppe Gariboldi (1833–1905), Italian classical flautist and composer
Italo Gariboldi (1879–1970), Italian general
Luciano Gariboldi (born 1927), Italian footballer

See also
Garibaldi (disambiguation)

Italian-language surnames